Estadio Bragaña García is a baseball stadium in Moca, Dominican Republic.  In 2015 it hosted the home games of Moca FC of the Liga Dominicana de Fútbol before they moved to Estadio Complejo Deportivo Moca 86.  The stadium holds 4,000 spectators.

External links
http://www.balompiedominicano.com/2015/03/estadios-llenos-en-la-primera-jornada.html
http://ldf.com.do

Football venues in the Dominican Republic
Moca FC